Hack-a-Shaq is a basketball defensive strategy used in the National Basketball Association (NBA) that involves committing intentional fouls (originally a clock management strategy) for the purpose of lowering opponents' scoring. The strategy was originally adapted by Dallas Mavericks coach Don Nelson, who directed players to commit personal fouls throughout the game against selected opponents who shot free throws poorly.

Nelson initially used the strategy against Dennis Rodman, a Hall of Fame power forward for the Detroit Pistons, San Antonio Spurs, and Chicago Bulls. However, the strategy acquired its name for Nelson's subsequent use of it against Hall of Fame center Shaquille O'Neal.

Name 
The term was coined when O'Neal played at LSU and during his NBA tenure with the Orlando Magic. At that time, the term referred simply to play especially physical defense against O'Neal. Teams sometimes defended him by bumping, striking or pushing him after he received the ball to deny him an easy layup or slam dunk. Because of O'Neal's poor free throw shooting, teams did not fear the consequences of committing personal fouls. However, once Nelson's off-the-ball fouling strategy became prevalent, the term Hack-a-Shaq was applied to this new tactic, and the original usage was largely forgotten.

The name is sometimes altered to reflect the player being fouled, for example Hack-a-Howard when used against Dwight Howard, or Hack-a-DJ for DeAndre Jordan. or Hack-a-Ben for Ben Simmons.

Background

Strategy of repeated intentional fouling 
Committing repeated intentional personal fouls is a longstanding defensive strategy used by teams that are trailing near the end of the game. Basketball, unique among major world sports, permits intentional fouling to gain a strategic advantage; in other sports, it is considered an unfair act or professional foul.

Once the fouling team enters the penalty situation, the fouled team is awarded free throws. The typical NBA player makes a high enough percentage of his free throws that, over time, opponents' possessions that end with free throws will yield more points than possessions in which the opponents try to score a field goal. Even the highest-scoring NBA teams average only about 1.1 points per possession. Giving such a team two free throws on each possession, the poorest free throw shooting teams make around 70% of their free throws and would score 1.4 points per possession. So intentionally fouling tends not to reduce the opponent's score.

However, fouls stop the game clock.  If a team is trailing with time running out, intentional fouling may be the only hope. In normal game play, the opponents will stall and run out the clock, even at the expense of failing to score, to the extent that the shot clock allows. The trailing team fouls intentionally to end the opponents' possession as soon as possible, leaving more time on the clock for the opposing team to respond to any score. It may also hope that fatigue and pressure affect the ability of the free-throw shooter.

When this strategy was originally employed in the NBA, the trailing team often made a point of fouling the opposition player who was the poorest free throw shooter in the game at that time, even if that player did not possess the ball.  However, fouling "off the ball" became a problem for the league when Wilt Chamberlain—a player of superstar caliber but an atrocious free throw shooter—entered the NBA.

Wilt Chamberlain and off-the-ball foul rule 

Wilt Chamberlain was such a dominant player that he was sure to be on the floor near the end of any close game; however, as a poor free throw shooter (51%), he became a natural target of a strategy of intentional fouling. The opposition was eager to send Chamberlain to the free throw line, and Chamberlain wished to avoid doing so. This led to a game of tag developing away from the basketball, with players chasing Chamberlain as he tried to avoid being fouled.

The NBA enacted a new rule on off-the-ball fouls—personal fouls against an offensive player who neither has the ball nor is trying to obtain it. On such fouls within the last two minutes of the game or in overtime, the offensive team is awarded the usual number of free throws and then possession of the ball. The new rule removed the benefit of fouling to gain possession of the ball and limited late-game intentional fouls to the ball handler.

The current version of the rule contains an additional disincentive to off-the-ball fouls: The free throws need not be attempted by the player who was fouled; the fouled team can choose any player on the court at the time as the shooter.

The reason they have that rule is that fouling someone off-the-ball looks foolish . . . Some of the funniest things I ever saw were players that used to chase [Wilt Chamberlain] like it was hide-and-seek. Wilt would run away from people, and the league changed the rule based on how silly that looked.
—Pat Riley

Hack-a-Shaq

Nelson's innovation 
There are several late-game situations where committing an isolated intentional foul makes sense. For a team trailing, late in the game, stopping the clock is a higher priority than keeping the opponents from scoring. In other situations, intentional fouling does not make sense because it typically lets the opponents score more points.

Intentional fouling every time the opponents get the ball was an innovation of Don Nelson in the late 1990s as coach of the Dallas Mavericks. He theorized that, if the opponents played an especially bad free throw shooter, intentionally fouling him might hold down his team's points per possession, compared to a conventional defense against them. Nelson used the strategy throughout the game, when the late-game penalties for off-the-ball fouls did not apply, such as the ball being given back to the fouled team.

Nelson did not invent the strategy; his innovation was to take a strategy whose primary purpose had always been simply stopping the clock, and use it instead primarily to minimize the opposition's scoring.

Hack-a-Rodman 
Nelson first used the strategy against Dennis Rodman of the Chicago Bulls in 1997, who was making 38% of his free throws on the season. He could not use the strategy on every Bulls possession, as a player committing his sixth foul is disqualified from the game. He used the strategy selectively, and chose a little-used player, whose absence the team could tolerate, to commit the fouls. He believed that Rodman's horrific foul shooting would result in the Mavericks actually giving up fewer total points during those Bulls possessions than they would give up by playing a standard defense against the Bulls' efficient offense, led by Michael Jordan and Scottie Pippen.

In that game, Rodman shot 9-for-12 from the free throw line, defeating the strategy, and the Bulls won the game.  The strategy was thus largely forgotten, except that Maverick player Bubba Wells, who had been assigned to foul Rodman, set the all-time NBA record for fewest minutes played (3) before fouling out of a game.

Nelson used the strategy again in 1999, this time against Shaquille O'Neal, a career 52% free throw shooter. Other NBA coaches also did so to defend against O'Neal. So, even though it had been first used two years earlier against Rodman, the strategy became known for its use against O'Neal.

Hack-a-Shaq 

Nelson first deployed the strategy against Shaquille O'Neal in the 1999–2000 season. O'Neal had a known weakness in free throw shooting, with a career average of 52.7%. He once missed all 11 of his free throw attempts in a game against the Seattle SuperSonics on December 8, 2000, a record. As the strategy proliferated throughout the league, the Lakers hired Ed Palubinskas to coach O'Neal on free throws. O'Neal's free throw percentage peaked at 62.2% in the 2002–03 season.

While playing, O'Neal's attitude toward the strategy was generally one of defiance, claiming that he would make the most crucial free throws "when they count", and that the strategy simply would not work against him. O'Neal called Nelson "a clown" for using the strategy. In his next game against O'Neal, Nelson showed up wearing a clown nose. During the 2008–09 preseason, O'Neal expressed his disapproval of San Antonio Spurs coach Gregg Popovich and his team's use of the Hack-a-Shaq during the first round of the 2008 playoffs.

On October 29, 2008, Popovich poked fun at O'Neal, having Michael Finley commit an intentional foul five seconds into the first game of the regular season. O'Neal laughed when he looked over to the Spurs bench and saw Popovich smiling while giving two thumbs up, further asserting that it was a joke.

Problem for the league 
As with Chamberlain decades earlier, intentional off-the-ball fouls against O'Neal became controversial. During the 2000 NBA playoffs, both the Portland Trail Blazers and Indiana Pacers relentlessly used the Hack-a-Shaq defense against the Lakers. The NBA discussed expanding the off-the-ball foul rule to cover more than just the final two minutes of the game, or another rule change that would discourage the use of Hack-a-Shaq. Ultimately, though, the NBA did not change any rules to discourage the Hack-a-Shaq strategy. An effective rebuttal was that the Lakers won both of the games where Hack-a-Shaq was notorious, suggesting that the strategy was too ineffective to require remediation.

Coach Gregg Popovich of the San Antonio Spurs used the Hack-a-Shaq strategy successfully in Game 5 of the Spurs' 2008 first round series against O'Neal and the Phoenix Suns. O'Neal made only 9 of his 20 free throws, dropping the Suns to 20-of-37 total on free throws. The Suns were eliminated from the playoffs in a 92–87 Spurs win. In May 2008, ESPN.com columnist John Hollinger named the Spurs Hack-a-Shaq use as the "Best Tactic" of the first two rounds of the 2008 NBA playoffs. Hollinger wrote that Popovich was the "first to really master how to use this weapon to his advantage." He explained that Popovich used the tactic "to eliminate 3-point attempts" and with 25 seconds or less at the end of quarters to get the ball back for the Spurs to gain the last possession. Hollinger stated "This should be a Eureka! moment for other coaches, and I expect it will be the league's most widely copied tactic next year."

In subsequent seasons, fans and media remained displeased with the continued use of the strategy, particularly in high-profile playoff games. In 2008, the NBA Competition Committee again considered rule changes but did not achieve consensus. According to an ESPN study in 2016, offensive efficiency was higher than the 2015–16 Golden State Warriors when the Hack-a-Shaq strategy was used against a team. NBA commissioner Adam Silver announced that the competition committee would look into changing the rule before the start of the 2016–2017 season due to extended length of games. It takes only three or more Hack-a-Shaq fouls to add 11 minutes to the length of a game, and at the time such fouls were being committed at a rate of four times more often than the prior season.

Application against other players 
The Hack-a-Shaq strategy is most effective against a player who shoots free throws poorly, but who is so effective in other areas that the coach is reluctant to simply remove them from the game. Few players other than O'Neal meet those criteria.

Ben Wallace shot only 42% free throws over his career, the worst percentage in the history of the NBA among players with 1000 attempts. Bruce Bowen was also among the game's best defenders but among its worst free throw shooters. Because of their struggles at the free throw line, each man has at times become a target of the Hack-a-Shaq strategy.

Dwight Howard 
On January 12, 2012, the Golden State Warriors hacked Orlando Magic center Dwight Howard intentionally throughout the game. The result was he attempted a record 39 free throws, breaking Wilt Chamberlain's record of 34 set in 1962. Howard entered the game making 42% of his free throws for the season and just below 60% for his career. He made 21 of the 39 attempts, and he finished with 45 points and 23 rebounds in the Magic's 117–109 victory. The following season, Howard was traded to the Lakers. In his first game back in Orlando on March 12, 2013, he made 25-of-39 free throws, setting Lakers records for free throws made and attempted while tying his NBA record for attempts. Howard made 16-of-20 free throws when he was fouled intentionally by the Magic.

Tiago Splitter 
On May 29, 2012, the Oklahoma City Thunder used a so-called hack-a-Splitter strategy on Tiago Splitter during Game 2 of Western Conference Final of 2012 NBA Playoffs, who made 5 of 10 free throw attempts from these fouls.

Josh Smith 
On April 10, 2015, the San Antonio Spurs was reported to use this strategy on Josh Smith to keep the basketball away from the super-hot James Harden and San Antonio Spurs won this season game by 104–103.

DeAndre Jordan 

During the 2015 NBA Playoffs, Howard, then with the Houston Rockets, was again targeted often by opponents, particularly during round 2 against the Los Angeles Clippers. During Game 2, Howard shot 21 (converting 8) out of the 64 free throws for the Rockets. In turn, the Rockets targeted DeAndre Jordan, who had been victim of "Hack-a-Jordan" or "Hack-a-DJ" since 2014, and in particular was fouled five times in two minutes during the previous playoff round against the San Antonio Spurs. In Game 4, Jordan broke O'Neal's record for most free throw attempts in a half game with 28.

Andre Drummond 
On January 20, 2016, the Houston Rockets (notably K.J. McDaniels) used Hack-a-Drummond against Detroit Pistons center Andre Drummond, and Drummond went 13 for 36 from the free throw line. Those 23 misses are an NBA record for most free throws missed by a player in a game. However, the Pistons still won the game 123-114.

André Roberson 
In the 2016–17 playoffs, Oklahoma City Thunder forward André Roberson was a victim of this strategy against the Houston Rockets in the first round of the playoffs. Roberson shot 3/21 in the series.

Ben Simmons 

On November 29, 2017, the Washington Wizards used what a newspaper called a "hack-a-Ben Simmons strategy" when trailing the Philadelphia 76ers by 24 points in the third quarter. The Wizards repeatedly fouled 76ers point guard Ben Simmons, giving him 29 free throws, 24 of them in the fourth quarter. Simmons was a notoriously bad shooter and had entered the game with a 56% free throw rate. He shot free throws even worse in this game, making 15/29 (52%). However, the 76ers held on to win the game, 118-113. Simmons' 31 points were a career high for him at the time.

On May 31, 2021, the Washington Wizards again used the same strategy in game four of the 2021 NBA playoffs, intentionally fouling Simmons three times late in the fourth quarter and sending Simmons to the foul line where he made only three-of-six attempts in the 114-122 loss to the Washington Wizards, and Simmons finished with five-of-eleven attempts made at the end of the game. On June 16, 2021, the Atlanta Hawks adopted the "hack-a-Ben strategy" in game five of the 2021 NBA playoffs, intentionally fouling Simmons in second and fourth quarters and sending Simmons to the foul line in the 106-109 loss to the Atlanta Hawks, Simmons finished with four-of-fourteen attempts made at the end of the game.

Criticism and rule changes 
Detractors argue that deliberate fouling makes the game unpleasant to watch, violates the spirit or disrupts the rhythm of the game, puts the fouling team too quickly into the penalty situation, and disparages the team's defensive abilities.

All that did was allow us to set our defense. I think that's disrespectful to their players. Basically, they were telling their players that they couldn't guard us.
— Detroit Pistons forward Tayshaun Prince, after Los Angeles Clippers coach Mike Dunleavy used the Hack-a-Shaq strategy against Pistons center Ben Wallace in a game in December 2005

Many coaches have heeded these criticisms and doubted the effectiveness of the strategy in minimizing scoring. One imponderable is the effect on the psychology of the player fouled deliberately on the belief that he will not make his free throws. Some believe that frequently sending O'Neal to the foul line risked putting him "into a rhythm" and temporarily making him a better shooter.

These factors, and the fact that there are only handful of players who satisfy the criteria for Hack-a-Shaq, mean that the strategy is uncommon in the NBA. A rule change starting in the 2016–17 NBA season put an additional constraint on deliberate fouling: Away-from-the-ball fouls now award the fouled team a free throw and possession of the ball in the final 2 minutes of each quarter, extended from the prior rule affecting only the final 2 minutes of the 4th quarter. The rule change sought to eliminate cases where teams would intentionally foul off-the-ball in order to gain the final possession of a quarter.

References 
 NBA Official Rule Book (Rule 12-B, Section X)

Basketball terminology
Basketball strategy